Three Minute Warnings: the Long Ryders Live in New York City is a live album by American band the Long Ryders, released in 2003 by Prima Records. It was recorded at the Bottom Line in New York City on 7 May 1987 and broadcast live on FM radio by WYRK.

Reception 

Three Minute Warnings was well received by critics. AllMusic rated the album four stars out of five, calling it "a jewel of a concert album", and commented: "The fact is that they're so "on" for this show ... that it almost wouldn't have mattered what they played, as long as they played this way". AllMusic wrote that the guitars "crunch and cut away at folk-ish and country-like melodies, sounding a lot like a garage punk version of the Eagles". Uncut and Mojo both gave it three stars out of five, writing that the live performance displayed "verve and commitment" and "highlights why the Long Ryders mattered". The Edmonton Journal described the album as "punk band energy, fused with clever pop craftmanship", and embellished with "countrified solos". Exclaim! magazine felt that the album contains "stellar versions of their most well-known songs", adding that "it serves as a reminder that without them, Jason & the Scorchers, Rank & File, and others, alt-country wouldn't exist." The Sunday Times described the performance as "loud, fast and impossibly tight ... fusing fragments of mythic Americana with a driving punk aesthetic, prophets without honour, playing for their lives."

Track listing

Personnel
The Long Ryders
Sid Griffin – guitar, harmonica, vocals
Steve McCarthy – guitar, mandolin, lap steel, vocals
Tom Stevens – bass, vocals
Greg Sowders – drums
Technical
David Van Der Heyden – producer, engineer
Bob Kranes – broadcast coordination
Tommy Sjostrom – photography
Phil Smee – design

References 

2003 live albums
The Long Ryders albums